The men's 100 m surface competition in finswimming at the 2001 World Games took place on 24 August 2001 at the Akita Prefectural Pool in Akita, Japan.

Competition format
A total of 19 athletes entered the competition. The best eight athletes from preliminary round qualifies to the final.

Results

Preliminary

Final

References

External links
 Results on IWGA website

Finswimming at the 2001 World Games